Events from the year 2014 in Macau, China.

Incumbents
 Chief Executive - Fernando Chui
 President of the Legislative Assembly - Ho Iat Seng

Events

March
 27 March - 8th Asian Film Awards.

October
 21–26 October - Women's Macau Open 2014.
 23–26 October - Men's Macau Open 2014.

November
 15 November - The establishment of Macau Design Centre in Nossa Senhora de Fátima.
 25–30 November - 2014 Macau Open Grand Prix Gold at Tap Seac Multi-sports Pavilion.

References

 
Years of the 21st century in Macau
Macau
Macau
2010s in Macau